Verkhotursky District is an administrative district (raion), one of the thirty in Sverdlovsk Oblast, Russia. As a municipal division, it is incorporated as Verkhotursky Urban Okrug. Its administrative center is the town of Verkhoturye. Population: 16,802 (2010 Census);  The population of Verkhoturye accounts for 52.5% of the district's total population.

References

Notes

Sources

Districts of Sverdlovsk Oblast